I Remember is a 1970 memoir written by author and artist Joe Brainard, depicting his childhood in the 1940s and '50s in Oklahoma as well as his life in the '60s and '70s in New York City.

Brainard followed I Remember with I Remember More (1972) and More I Remember More (1973), both published by Angel Hair.

Background

Synopsis

Reception 

I Remember is Brainard's best-known work. Paul Auster said the memoir was "one of the few totally original books I have ever read."

I Remember has inspired many homages, none more notable than OuLiPian Georges Perec's Je me souviens which was dedicated to Brainard. Poet Kenneth Koch was the first to utilize I Remember in the classroom as a prompt in teaching children to write poetry. The simplicity of the form has had great appeal to both writers and teachers, and most who use it are unaware of its origins.

In 1998 filmmaker Avi Zev Weider premiered his short film I Remember at the Sundance Film Festival. The film, an adaptation of Brainard's book, went on to play over 25 film festivals worldwide. Novelist Paul Auster was the Executive Producer on the film. The film stars John Cameron Mitchell and Liam Aiken.

In 2012 filmmaker Matt Wolf released the short I Remember: A Film About Joe Brainard using archival film footage and recordings of Brainard's readings.

In 2014 Mexican author Margo Glantz wrote Yo también me acuerdo.

References 

1970 non-fiction books
American memoirs
Books about writers
LGBT autobiographies
1970s LGBT literature
LGBT literature in the United States